

"Coffee Lake-S WS" (14 nm)

Xeon E-2xxx (uniprocessor) 
 Xeon E-2x1x2x3: x1 represents the generation. x3 represents the number of cores.
 No suffix letter: without integrated GPU
 -G: with integrated GPU
 -M: BGA mobile processor
 -L: low power
 -E: embedded

"Coffee Lake-H" (14 nm)

Xeon E-2xxxM (uniprocessor) 
Xeon E-2186M & 2286M support Intel Thermal Velocity Boost.

References 

 
 
 
 
 
 

Intel Xeon (Coffee Lake)